Presidential Guard may refer to:

Bolivian Colorados Regiment (Bolivia)
Estado Mayor Presidencial (Presidential General Staff) (Mexico)
The Kremlin Regiment or Presidential Regiment of Russia
La Moneda Palace Guard (Chile)
Palestinian Presidential Guard (State of Palestine)
President Guard Regiment (Bangladesh)
Presidential Guard (Belarus)
Presidential Guard (Cameroon)
Presidential Guard (Greece)
Presidential Guard (South Vietnam)
Presidential Guard (Zimbabwe)
Presidential Guard Battalion (Brazil)
Presidential Guard Brigade (Nigeria)
Presidential Guard Brigade (Uganda)
Presidential Guard Regiment (Turkey)
Presidential Guard Unit (Angola)
Presidential Guard Unit (Cyprus)
Presidential National Guard (Tajikistan)
Presidential Protective Division (United States)
Presidential Security Force of Indonesia (Paspampres) (Indonesia)
President's Bodyguard (India)
President's Own Guard Regiment (Ghana)
Regiment of Presidential Security (Burkina Faso)
Somaliland Presidential Guard or CIM (Somaliland)
Special Presidential Division (Zaire)
State Protection and Guard Service of Moldova, formerly the Presidential Guard Service
United Arab Emirates Presidential Guard

See also
Republican guard
Royal guard